The Hitler birthplace memorial stone, a memorial to victims of the Nazis, is placed in front of Salzburger Vorstadt 15, Braunau am Inn, Upper Austria, the building where Adolf Hitler was born in 1889.

Birth house of Hitler
At the time of Hitler's birth, the building was a modest guest house, where Hitler's parents rented rooms in connection with his father's job as a minor customs official at the nearby Austrian–German border.  The Hitlers lived in the building only until Adolf was three years old, when his father was transferred to Passau.

After World War II, the building was rented by the Austrian Republic in 1952 and obtained heritage protection as part of the historic city centre. Until 1965, it was the home of the public library and later a bank. From 1970 to 1976, several classes from the technical high school were held in the house, until the school was rebuilt. The house then for many years accommodated a branch of the charity "Lebenshilfe", and operated as a day centre and workshops for people with learning difficulties.  After the charity left the building in 2011, it remained empty. As of 2016, the Austrian government intends to expropriate the owner and to demolish the building. A special expropriation law was adopted.

Suggestions regarding making Hitler's birthplace a place of remembrance for the victims of Nazism had already been made in the early years after the war. For a long time, the council discussed putting up a memorial tablet on the house, and in 1983 the decision was made by the then mayor Hermann Fuchs, with intervention from Culture Advisor Wolfgang Simböck. However, the memorial tablet was not attached, because the owner (who had no connection to Hitler) felt that it would be an intrusion on her rights of ownership.  She successfully opposed it in court because of her fear of unwelcome attention or attacks from anti- or Neonazis.

Installation of the stone 

In 1989, the new mayor, Gerhard Skiba, took the initiative. In April 1989, (two weeks before the centenary of Hitler's birth) a memorial was placed directly in front of the house on public ground. The stone for the memorial came from a quarry on the grounds of the former Mauthausen Concentration Camp, near Linz, Austria. The inscription on the memorial reads:

The official name of the memorial is the "Memorial Stone Against War and Fascism". It appears as the "Mahnstein" ("Remembrance Stone") on street maps.

See also
 Adolf Hitler's Munich apartment
 Gerhard Skiba
 Braunau Contemporary History Days
 House of Responsibility

References

External links
 House of Responsibility

Birthplace memorial stone
Braunau am Inn
1989 establishments in Austria
Monuments and memorials to the victims of Nazism
Buildings and structures in Upper Austria
Historic sites in Austria
20th-century architecture in Austria